Wanamakers is an unincorporated community in Lynn Township in Lehigh County, Pennsylvania. It is part of the Lehigh Valley, which has a population of 861,899 and is the 68th most populous metropolitan area in the U.S. as of the 2020 census. 

Wanamakers is located at the intersection of Pennsylvania Route 143 and Steinsville Road.

References

Unincorporated communities in Lehigh County, Pennsylvania
Unincorporated communities in Pennsylvania